The 12th Parliament of Singapore was a meeting of the Parliament of Singapore. The Parliament is unicameral – all Members of Parliament (MPs) make up a single chamber, and there is no senate or upper house. The Constitution of Singapore states that the Parliament of Singapore shall consist of such a number of members who are elected by the people in a general election, up to nine Non-constituency Members of Parliament (NCMPs) and up to nine Nominated Members of Parliament (NMPs), following changes to the Constitution enacted on 26 April 2010. After the 2011 general election, 87 MPs were elected and three NCMPs were appointed (or, in the terms of the Parliamentary Elections Act, declared elected) to Parliament.

Elected Members of Parliament

The names in bold (sorted according to alphabetical order) are the individuals' surnames, except for Indian and Malay persons, where personal names are indicated.
Png Eng Huat was elected following the Hougang by-election in 2012.
Lee Li Lian was elected following the Punggol East by-election in 2013.

Lee Hsien Loong is also the Prime Minister.
Ng Eng Hen is also the Minister for Defence and the Leader of the House.
Josephine Teo is also the Senior Minister of State for the Ministry of Finance and the Ministry of Transport.
Teo Ho Pin is also Mayor of North West District and the Deputy Government Whip.
Gan Kim Yong is also the Minister for Health and the Government Whip.
Low Yen Ling is also the Parliamentary Secretary for the Ministry of Social and Family Development and the Ministry of Culture, Community and Youth, as well as Mayor of South West District.
Lee Yi Shyan is also the Senior Minister of State for the Ministry of Trade and Industry and the Ministry of National Development.
Lim Swee Say is also the Minister for Manpower.
Maliki is also the Minister of State for the Ministry of National Development and the Ministry of Defence, and Mayor of South East District.
Sim Ann is also the Minister of State for the Ministry of Education and the Ministry of Communications and Information.
Vivian is also the Minister for the Environment and Water Resources.
Amy Khor is also the Senior Minister of State for the Ministry of Health and the Ministry of Manpower, as well as the Deputy Government Whip.
Charles Chong is also the Deputy Speaker of Parliament.
Halimah is also the Speaker of Parliament.
Desmond Lee is also the Minister of State for the Ministry of National Development.
Tharman is also the Deputy Prime Minister and the Minister for Finance.
Goh Chok Tong is conferred the title of Emeritus Senior Minister.
Seah Kian Peng is also the Deputy Speaker of Parliament.
Tan Chuan-Jin is also the Minister for Social and Family Development.
Lui Tuck Yew is also the Minister for Transport and the Second Minister for Defence.
Denise Phua is also Mayor of Central Singapore District.
Yaacob is also the Minister for Communications and Information and the Minister-in-charge of Muslim Affairs.
Faishal is also the Parliamentary Secretary for the Ministry of Health and the Ministry of Transport.
Shanmugam is also the Minister for Foreign Affairs and the Minister of Law.
Teo Chee Hean is also the Deputy Prime Minister, the Coordinating Minister for National Security and the Minister for Home Affairs.
Teo Ser Luck is also the Minister of State for the Ministry of Trade and Industry and Mayor of North East District.
Sam Tan is also the Minister of State in the Prime Minister's Office and the Ministry of Culture, Community and Youth.
Hawazi is also the Senior Parliamentary Secretary for the Ministry of Education and the Ministry of Manpower.
Khaw Boon Wan is also the Minister for National Development.
Lam Pin Min is also the Minister of State for the Ministry of Health.
Heng Swee Keat is also the Minister for Education.
Masagos is also the Minister in the Prime Minister's Office, Second Minister for Home Affairs and Second Minister for Foreign Affairs.
Chan Chun Sing is also the Minister in the Prime Minister's Office.
Indranee is also the Senior Minister of State for the Ministry of Law and the Ministry of Education.
Iswaran is also the Minister in the Prime Minister’s Office, Second Minister for Home Affairs and Second Minister for Trade and Industry.
Lim Hng Kiang is also the Minister for Trade and Industry.
Lawrence Wong is also the Minister for Culture, Community and Youth and Second Minister for Communications and Information.
Heng Chee How is also the Senior Minister of State in the Prime Minister’s Office and the Deputy Leader of the House.
Grace Fu is also the Minister in the Prime Minister’s Office, Minister-in-charge of the Municipal Services Office, Second Minister for the Environment and Water Resources and Second Minister for Foreign Affairs.

Non-constituency Members of Parliament

The names in bold (sorted according to alphabetical order) are the individuals' surnames.

Nominated Members of Parliament

The names in bold (sorted according to alphabetical order) are the individuals' surnames, except for Indian and Malay persons, where personal names are indicated.

See also

2011 Singaporean general election
Constituencies of Singapore
Parliament of Singapore
Third Lee Hsien Loong Cabinet
List of members of the 13th Parliament of Singapore

References

External links
 List of Current MPs, Parliament of Singapore
 Current MPs, Channel NewsAsia
 List of Former MPs, Parliament of Singapore

Members of the Parliament of Singapore
Lists of political office-holders in Singapore